Chusak Sriphum (born 16 September 1976) is a Thai football manager He is the current head coach of Thai League 2 club  Rayong.

References

External links
https://us.soccerway.com/coaches/chusak-sriphum/644189/

Living people
Chusak Sriphum
1976 births
Chusak Sriphum